Taquita & Kaui is an American reality television series on MTV and MTV Canada. The series premiered on April 2, 2007. The series follows Taquita Thorns and Kaui Beamer, former contestants on Making the Band 3, as they work on jump starting their new lives together as roommates in Las Vegas. The theme song is Proud Mary in the Tina Turner style and each episode has different ending introductions, à la Muppet Show, such as the K on the marquee dropping down into Kaui's hands.

Production and Cancellation
MTV originally ordered eight episodes of the series but on April 23, 2007, the series was pulled off the air with reruns in its place. The four unaired episodes were never shown.

Kaui posted on her Myspace that MTV had planned to finish the series off but executives decided against it due to the low number of viewers watching the series.

Episodes

References

External links
 
 MTV site
 Taquita and Kaui.com

2000s American reality television series
2007 American television series debuts
2007 American television series endings
MTV original programming